Malaguti is an Italian bicycle, scooter and motorcycle company based in San Lazzaro di Savena, founded by Antonino Malaguti in 1930.  Producing bicycles until 1958, they then entered the motorcycle market.  Noted for their use of small engines in their bikes. In October 2011, Malaguti laid off its remaining employees in Bologna, Italy as the company eventually folded.  

In 2018 the brand name was purchased by the Austrian firm KSR Group GmbH.

History

Born in 1930 in Bologna as a resale and repair shop for bicycles thanks to Antonino Malaguti, a twenty-two year old who in the mid-twenties had been a promising young cyclist, Malaguti soon became a manufacturer of cycles with an appreciated production, even if limited to the Bologna area.

Having escaped the bombings of the Second World War, the company immediately resumed production and, given the enormous demand for post-war means of locomotion, in 1949 it began to build an economical two-engine with a central beam frame of clear cycling derivation, equipped with traction. roller with Mosquito motor. In a slow and constant evolution, the same frame was equipped with front and rear suspensions, drum brakes, large tank and 49 cm³ two-stroke engine of the German Espress Werke, completing the metamorphosis with the "Express" and "Express Sport" mopeds, put up for sale in 1957.

Until the first half of the sixties, Malaguti production was aimed exclusively at economic mopeds intended for the transport of things and people, but the economic boom and mass motorization forced the construction of mopeds for recreational use by the fourteen-year-olds.
In 1963, after concluding a supply contract with Motori Franco Morini, the 50 Gransport sports moped was presented, which achieved good sales success, particularly on the French market where it was offered under the 50 Olympique name. In the second half of the sixties, the renewed version of the 50 Gransport, equipped with a striking double bilateral exhaust pipe, was joined by the 50 Roncobilaccio model, one of the first Italian off-road mopeds.

In the following decades other models with good commercial success saw the light such as the Fifty of 1974, one of the most successful moped, subsequently the Malaguti Track, Drop and the Dribbling, in 1985 the Malaguti Runner 125 an enduro motorcycle was presented.

1990-2010 
 
In the following years the production was moved towards the more profitable sector of the scooters, maintaining however the production line of the Fifty which enjoyed excellent success; in 1992 debut the Malaguti Centro, the first modern high-wheeled scooter produced, in 1994 the most successful was presented, the Phantom, whose sale continued for thirteen years, ending at the end of 2007 replaced by the new "Phantom R" version. For many years it has had a close relationship of collaboration with the German motor company Sachs and has also established partnerships with Yamaha for the supply of engines for larger displacement scooters.
In the early 2000s, it invested heavily in the medium-large scooter sector, bringing into production numerous models from the small Malaguti Ciak and new Centro to the larger Madison, Blog, Password and SpiderMax developed by Engines Engineering and equipped with 500 cc Piaggio Master engine.
The mopeds of the current production are equipped with Yamaha, Piaggio, Minarelli and Kymco engines.
The synergy that has existed for many years between Ducati and Malaguti, in which their son Learco (name imposed in honor of a great friend of Antonino, Learco Guerra) and grandsons Marco and Antonino (same name as his grandfather), is testified by the fact that this company often produces Ducati Corse models and replicas. Among the latest models in production there is a return to the production of classic road motorcycles such as the Drakon.

2010s 
In later years Malaguti struggled to compete with the influx of low-price mopeds and motorcycles from other parts of Asia.  The company also received financial help from the government, which ended in the same month that the company folded.  As early as 2009-2010 temporary staff were being dismissed.  Production at the factory stopped in April 2011, with the doors officially closing 31 October 2011, 170 workers lost their jobs and received a severance pay of €30 000 each.  17 employees were kept on to meet contractual obligations regarding spare parts and to dismantle the production line, after this they were moved to a smaller venue to continue these obligations.  The company closed with a capital of €40 000 000.  The large sign on the Malaguti factory was removed on 19 December 2011.  

In 2018 the brand name “Malaguti” was purchased by Austrian group KSR Group GmbH with the first range of motorcycles released February 2019.

List of Models 

Cavalcone Radiale Cross CR5T
Cavalcone Cross 50
F15 Firefox — 50 cc sport scooter with digital dash, liquid-cooled engine and twin disk brakes. Unlike the European version, for the US only limited number of units were imported and they featured limited numbers, certificates, and gold plated numbers in the Ben Bostrom US edition. Both the 50 and 150cc version have 13 inch wheels 
F10 Jet Line — Fitted with a Minarelli Italian motor. Features include an under-the-seat storage box, optional rear rack, body extension passenger foot-rests, center stand, electric start, and automatic transmission.
F12 Phantom — includes Paioli shocks, Grimeca brakes, alloy wheels, Pirelli/Maxxis tires. One of Malaguti's most iconic scooters. Two families of models were available. The original one, produced from the 90s onwards, featured a 50 cc two-stroke engine and was later joined for a brief period by a 100 cc two-stroke engine version on the same frame (some models were air-cooled, some liquid-cooled). The second family was the Phantom Max (produced in the 2000s), which had almost identical exterior aesthetics, but was actually a redesign featuring a bigger frame (and overall size), and bigger four-stroke, 4 valve 1 cylinder liquid-cooled engines manufactured by Piaggio (125, 200 and 250 cc).
F18 Warrior — 150 cc engine. Featuring a design in part reminiscent of the previous F15 Firefox with a similar size, it entered the market before the F12 Phantom Max.
Madison was only purchased for limited release in US and was never sold for general distribution. It was however distributed regularly in other countries (including Malaguti's home country, Italy).

Fifty
Fifty Black Special
Hombre HO4
Haccapi
Olympique TR
Ronco
Saigon 50cc (1966 - 1968)
Centro
Crosser
Password
Blog
Ciak
Yesterday
Spidermax
XSM 50
XTM 50

Electric and hybrid vehicle 

Malaguti was among the pioneers in the electric scooter sector by introducing the Ciak Electric Power model in November 2000 on the Italian market. This model developed together with Engines Engineering was equipped with a 12V lead-acid battery pack and a Brushless motor of 1.23 kW at 1,400 rpm and 17 Nm of maximum torque. The declared autonomy varied between 40 km and 60 km. The Ciak Electric Power was produced until 2007. It achieved some success among private customers thanks to the eco incentives allocated by the Italian government; some specimens were also purchased by the Italian police.

Also in 2000 Malaguti presented the prototypes of the Madison 125 dual-fuel petrol and LPG with an additional 4-liter LPG tank and solenoid valve to select the type of fuel.

KSR Group (2019-present) 
Dune 125
RST 125
Madison 125/150
Madison 300
Monte Pro 125
XSM 125
XTM 125
Mission 125 and 200
Drakon 125
Spectre GP 125

See also 

List of companies of Italy
List of motorcycle manufacturers

References

External links

Motorcycle manufacturers of Italy
Scooter manufacturers
Moped manufacturers
Vehicle manufacturing companies established in 1930
Italian companies established in 1930
Italian brands
1930 establishments in Italy
2011 disestablishments in Italy
Malaguti